The Philippine Handball Federation is the national governing body for Handball in the Philippines and is a voting member of the Philippine Olympic Committee since 2011. It is accredited by the International Handball Federation.

References

External links
Philippine Handball Federation profile at the Philippine Olympic Committee website

Philippines
Philippines
Handball in the Philippines
Handball